Petar Glavchev (Bulgarian: Петър Главчев; born 19 August 1999) is a Bulgarian footballer who plays as a midfielder for Levski Karlovo.

Career

Lokomotiv Plovdiv 
On 31 May 2017 he made his debut for Lokomotiv Plovdiv in match against Ludogorets Razgrad.

On 1 February 2019, Glavchev was loaned out to FC Vereya.

Career statistics

Club

Personal life
Glavchev is the son of a famous Bulgarian rapper who goes under the name Vanko 1 (Bulgarian: Ванко 1)

Notes

References

External links 
 

1999 births
Living people
Bulgarian footballers
PFC Lokomotiv Plovdiv players
First Professional Football League (Bulgaria) players
Association football midfielders